Douglas McFerran (born 1958) is an English actor and writer. He has also directed and produced a small number of television programmes and films.

Filmography
As actor:

As writer:

References

Notes
 Film directed by Peter Howitt.
 Directed/produced by McFerran.

External links
 

1958 births
20th-century English male actors
21st-century English male actors
Actors from Luton
English male film actors
English male television actors
English television directors
English television producers
Living people
People from Luton